HM Transport Inc. is one of the largest bus companies in the Philippines. It offers both provincial and city operations, servicing routes from Metro Manila to Laguna province and vice versa. Its city operation subsidiary, Worthy Transport Inc. services routes from Airport Loop, Pasay, Plaza Lawton, Manila, FTI Complex, Taguig, Baclaran, Parañaque, Ayala Avenue, Makati and Pacita Complex, San Pedro, Laguna, all the way to SM Fairview in Quezon City.

Etymology
The bus company was derived from the initials of its founder, Homer Mercado, a bus operator, who was believed to be a grand nephew of Filipino national hero, Jose Rizal. He is the president of the Southern Luzon Bus Operators Association (SOLUBOA) and has been a party-list representative of United Transport Coalition (commonly known as 1-UTAK partylist) (now 1-JAM G Partylist).

History

Before HM Transport was formed, a bus company named Laguna Transport Company Inc. or LTCI, a sister company of JAM was established in the early 1980s. It services routes from Santa Cruz, Laguna, to Lawton, Manila, and Cubao, Quezon City, along with other competitors, Kapalaran Bus Lines, also a provincial bus company that is established in the same decade; however, it was phased out in the mid-1990s due to labor disputes, and Batangas Laguna Tayabas Bus Company Inc. (now Del Monte Land Transport Bus Company or DLTBCo).

In 2001, a major split out occurred. This resulted to forming of HM Transport Inc. that serves routes from Santa Cruz, Laguna, to Cubao, Quezon City, and Alabang, Muntinlupa. Another one is Green Star Express, a provincial bus company servicing routes, this time, from the same place to Lawton, Manila. Thus, the brand name Laguna Transport Company Inc. was then changed into its new name Laguna Express Inc. or LEI, but it was rebranded into Calamba Megatrans Inc. in 2007. This bus company services Calamba-Plaza Lawton, Manila route, the Santa Cruz - Cubao route, and for a time, the Alabang - Santa Cruz route.
Both HM Transport and Green Star Express dominate other provincial buses in Laguna. With its terminal at Barangay Pagsawitan, Pagsanjan, Laguna after passing through Santa Cruz, Laguna, these bus companies share each other at the old garage of defunct Kapalaran Bus Lines. After the JAC Liner Inc. buy out of Green Star Express Inc and Laguna Express Inc., the terminal was moved to the former HM Liner terminal.

Recent Updates

HM Transport was the first provincial bus company to adopt a new alternative for energy, using compressed natural gas (CNG) as a substitute for diesel. In 2004, some liquified petroleum gas tanks (LPG) placed the former diesel compartments of some units. Now, other bus companies followed HM Transport's example, such as her sister companies Green Star Express and Batangas Star Express Corp./KL CNG Bus Transport Corp., RRCG Transport, and Biñan Bus Line Transport System Inc. (BBL Trans).

Last year, Green Star, a subsidiary of Calamba Megatrans, Inc. operated using ex- Calamba Megatrans, Inc Nissan Diesel buses, DMMC Higers, (and Almazora Higers) some of which are Airconditioned
and ex-HM Transport, Inc. Nissan Diesel buses(A-102 to A-163). They have new Daewoo buses that goes to the same routes as their sisters.

Fleet

HM Transport utilizes and maintains the following buses:
UD Nissan Diesel Exfoh 
UD Nissan Diesel PKB
UD Nissan Diesel Higer FE6B
UD Nissan Diesel Exfohtong
UD Nissan Diesel Daewoo BAR
Hino Grand Echo 1
Hino Grand Echo 2
Hino Partex Higer
Hino Almazora
Almazora City Star
Almazora Higer AMC
Almazora Nissan Diesel CPB87N
Almazora Volvo B11R
Daewoo Bus BF106
Daewoo Bus BV115
Daewoo Bus BS106
Daewoo Bus BH117H
Daewoo Bus BM090 Royal Midi
Isuzu FVR 
Hyundai Universe Space Classic
Hyundai Universe Space Xpress Noble
Hyundai Aero City
Higer KLQ6100
Higer KLQ6109 V90
Higer KLQ6109E3
Higer KLQ6119 V91
Higer KLQ6112HQE30
Higer KLQ6129G
Golden Dragon XML6103
Golden Dragon XML6125J28C
Guilin Daewoo GDW6119H2
Yutong ZK6100H
Yutong ZK6107HA
Yutong ZK6107HD
Yutong ZK6119HD
Yutong ZK6122HD9
Yutong ZK6118HGK
Yutong ZK6858H9
King Long XMQ6119T
King Long XMQ6117Y
King Long XMQ6118Y
King Long XMQ6127J
Autodelta Volvo B7R
Autodelta Volvo B7RLE
Autodelta Volvo B8R
Autodelta Volvo B11R
Ankai HFC6108H
Ankai HFF6120GZ–4
Ankai HFF6119KDE5B
Ankai Aspire
Asiastar JS6126GHA
Asiastar YBL6125H
Asiastar YBL6100H

Routes

City Operation
 Pacita Complex, San Pedro City, Laguna - Navotas Terminal via EDSA
 Pacita Complex, San Pedro City, Laguna - SM Fairview via EDSA Commonwealth Avenue
 Baclaran/LRT Ayala - SM Fairview-Lagro via EDSA, Ayala Ave.
 Ayala Center, Makati - Market! Market!, Taguig or SM Aura Premier, Taguig via Fort Bonifacio Global City Kalayaan Avenue - operates under memorandum of agreement with Bonifacio Transport Corporation (also known as BGC Bus), a bus company under Fort Bonifacio Development Corp., a conglomerate of Ayala Corporation and SM Investments Corporation supports by SM Supermalls.

 Alabang - Lawton via Skyway, SLEX, Buendia, Taft Avenue (uses regular buses.)
Airport Loop - Pasay Rotonda Terminal - NAIA Terminal 3 via Resorts World Manila, New Port City, Marriott Hotel, Remington Hotel & Baclaran

Provincial Operation
 Santa Cruz, Laguna - Cubao, Quezon City via EDSA / C5, SLEX 
 Santa Cruz, Laguna - Parañaque Integrated Terminal Exchange, Parañaque - via SLEX
 Santa Cruz, Laguna - Alabang, Muntinlupa via SLEX (uses air-conditioned buses).
 Santa Cruz, Laguna - Plaza Lawton, Manila via SLEX (operated by Calamba Megatrans Inc.)
 Calamba, Laguna - Alabang, Muntinlupa via SLEX (operated by Calamba Megatrans Inc. and HM Transport Inc.)
 Calamba, Laguna - Lawton - some of the Santa Cruz fleet are stationed here, along with new buses.
 Calamba, Laguna - Cubao, Quezon City via EDSA / C5, SLEX
 Pacita Complex, San Pedro City, Laguna - Plaza, Lawton, Manila via SLEX (operated by South City Express Inc./Pacita Liner Inc.)
 Santa Rosa Integrated Terminal, Santa Rosa, Laguna - Cubao Quezon City via EDSA SLEX Balibago Exit

P2P Service
 Pacita Complex, San Pedro City, Laguna - Market! Market! BGC Taguig via SLEX C-5 Exit (Daily from 9am to 1:45am). *Express Connect
 Pacita Complex, San Pedro City, Laguna - Venice Megaworld Mall McKinley Via SLEX Taguig
 Balibago Complex, Sta. Rosa Laguna - Market! Market! BGC Taguig via SLEX C-5 Exit.

Premium P2P Service

 Robinsons Galleria (Quezon City) - Glorietta 3 (Makati)
 Alabang Town Center (Muntinlupa) - Market! Market! (Taguig) 
 Pandi (Bulacan) - TriNoma via Mindanao Avenue NLEX Plaridel Bypass Road
 Balagtas (Bulacan) - TriNoma via Mindanao Avenue NLEX Plaridel Bypass Road
 Plaridel (Bulacan) - TriNoma via Mindanao Avenue NLEX Plaridel Bypass Road

Subsidiaries

 Worthy Transport Inc. - a city operation division of HM Transport Inc.
 Calamba Megatrans Inc.
 South City Express Inc./Juaymah Maureen Transport
 Silver Star Shuttle Tours and Transport, Inc. owned and operated by HM Transport Inc. and under Pacita Liner Inc.
 Batangas Star Express Corp./KL CNG Bus Transport Corp.
 BCB Transport Inc.
 Pascual Liner operated by HM Transport
 Pandacan Transport Inc.
 Original Transport Service Cooperative Inc.

Former Bus Companies

 South Star Transport Express Inc.
 Quezon Liner Inc.
 Grand Star Coach Bus Co. Inc.
 Laguna Trans Co., Inc
 South Star Express Inc.
 Laguna Express Inc. (sold to JAC Liner Inc.)
 Green Star Express Inc. (sold to JAC Liner Inc)
 Delta Transport Inc./Tessele One Liner Inc. - Sold to RMB Line Jnc. and DSN Transport.

See also

 Green Star Express - sold by JAC Liner Inc.
 List of bus companies of the Philippines

References

Bus companies of the Philippines
Companies based in Laguna (province)